Ann Tsukamoto was born in California on July 6, 1952. She is well known now as an Asian American stem cell researcher and inventor. During her career, she co-patented a process that allowed the human stem cell to be isolated, and the patent was granted in 1991. Tsukamoto’s research and contributions in the medical field have led to groundbreaking advancements of stem cell research as it pertains to cancer patients. She is a pioneer in her field, yet is underrepresented for her discoveries.

Life summary 
Ann Tsukamoto earned her Ph.D in immunology and macrobiology at the University of California Los Angeles. However, Ann did most of her postdoctoral work at the University of California, San Francisco. Here, she worked on the wnt-1 gene and “developed a transgenic model for breast cancer.” [6]. Tsukamoto's intelligence, determination, and hard work lead her to become one of the most prominent scientists researching and studying stem cells. Ann Tsukamoto's highly-renowned innovations  began in the late twentieth century and she is currently directing further research to discover new findings to advance stem cell research even more.

Ann's Innovation & Pain point addressed 
Tsukamoto first patented her research on how to isolate stem cells in 1991. Stem cells research and discovery is imperative not only in scientific communities, but also in the medical field. Ann's work opened the study of stem cells to dive deeper and allowed for a more definitive understanding of the circulatory systems of cancer patients. What Tsukamoto came to find is the importance of stem cells  in the search to find a cure for cancer and many other human illnesses. In 1998, she worked for StemCells Incorporated to continue her research that continued in the isolation of liver and neural stem cells as they affect various diseases. Tsukamoto leads the search for better understanding stem cells and its relation to finding a cure to cancer as well as many other fatal ailments. The cure for cancer and similar illnesses seemed to have no potential cure, which is the pain point that drove Ann to research and study stem cells in a way that would solve this problem and ultimately find a potential cure.  

Tsukamoto’s innovation, despite being incredibly important, did not make her a household name because of how women were so poorly represented in the scientific and medical field at the time. In addition, when Ann published her discoveries, other scientists did not understand how crucial stem cell research was in how it could be used towards a cure, thus her findings were not considered nearly as transformational as they should have been. Now, stem cells are known to be very important to both medical advancement and science.

Impact on Society 
Ann's work of stem cell research and its relation to cancer patients saved countless lives and this number is growing exponentially with continued research and treatment. Before Ann's research and discoveries in the stem cell field, there was considered to be no cure for cancer and other illnesses of the same caliber. This is a revolutionary discovery that could change how fatal cancer and similar illnesses are considered in the medical field. As Tsukamoto continues to study stem cells, her contributions and previous legacy remains seen and increasingly more relevant to current research in the field of cancer and stem cells. The innovation is still used today, though it continues to advance as more and more research is conducted.

References 

“10 female inventors you should definitely know about.” (2020, February 17). ONE: Girls and Women. Last Retrieved April 19, 2022, from https://www.one.org/international/blog/10-female-inventors-you-should-definitely-know-about/ 

Ashlock, Sarah. (2020, May 3). Ann Tsukamoto: The Truth about Stem Cells. On The Dot Women. Last Retrieved April 18, 2022, from https://onthedotwoman.com/woman/ann-tsukamoto 

“Profiles of Women Working In STEM: Ann Tsukamoto.” (2021). Geena Davis Institute on Gender in Media. Last Retrieved April 19, 2022, from https://seejane.org/profile/ann-tsukamoto/ 

“Stem Cells Fast Facts.” (2021, May 28). CNN Health. Last Retrieved April 19, 2022, from https://www.cnn.com/2013/07/05/health/stem-cells-fast-facts/index.html 

Living people
20th-century American women scientists
21st-century American women scientists
1952 births
Stem cell researchers
20th-century American biologists
21st-century American biologists
American women biologists
University of California, San Diego alumni
University of California, Los Angeles alumni
University of California, San Francisco alumni
21st-century American inventors
Women inventors